Events in the year 1686 in Norway.

Incumbents
Monarch: Christian V

Events
The Cathedral Hellig Trefoldigheds Kirke in Christiania burned down (completed in 1639).

Arts and literature

Births

31 January - Hans Egede, Lutheran missionary (d.1758)

Deaths

Exact date missing 
Christen Nielsen Holberg, army officer (born c. 1625)

See also

References